Season six of Seinfeld, an American comedy television series created by Jerry Seinfeld and Larry David, began airing on September 22, 1994, and concluded on May 18, 1995, on NBC. Season six placed first in the Nielsen ratings, above Home Improvement and ER.

Production
Seinfeld was produced by Castle Rock Entertainment and distributed by Columbia Pictures Television and Columbia TriStar Television and was aired on NBC in the US. The executive producers were Larry David, George Shapiro, and Howard West with Tom Gammill and Max Pross as supervising producers. Bruce Kirschbaum was the executive consultant, after being a staff writer in the previous season. This season was directed by Andy Ackerman, replacing Tom Cherones, who had directed the majority of the episodes of the previous five seasons following the original pilot episode.   Ackerman would direct every episode for the remainder of the series' run, with the exception of season six's "The Secretary" and season eight's "The Comeback", both directed by David Owen Trainor.

The series was set predominantly in an apartment block on New York City's Upper West Side; however, the sixth season was shot and mostly filmed in CBS Studio Center in Studio City, California. The show features Jerry Seinfeld as himself, and a host of Jerry's friends and acquaintances, which include George Costanza, Elaine Benes, and Cosmo Kramer, portrayed by Jason Alexander, Julia Louis-Dreyfus and Michael Richards, respectively.

Episodes

Reception 
The review aggregator website Rotten Tomatoes reported an 80% approval rating based on 5 critic reviews.

References

External links

 
 
 

6
1994 American television seasons
1995 American television seasons